Stuart Rodney Bell is the current bishop of Wales, of the Anglican Convocation in Europe. He was consecrated On March 18, 2023, becoming the first bishop of Wales for the Anglican Network in Europe, a "proto-province" recognized by the Global Fellowship of Confessing Anglicans. He was formerly a canon of the Church in Wales and a former rector of St Michael's Church, Aberystwyth.

A native of Torquay, Bell sought ordination, expressing a call to Wales. He learned the Welsh language and began his ministry in 1972. He identified himself with the evangelical wing of the church, and was involved in the Evangelical Fellowsh of the Chrich in Wales. In 1988 he became rector of Aberystwyth, in charge of the largest Anglican Church in Wales, Saint Michael's and All Angels, Aberystwyth. 

Bell was elected Bishop of Wales in August 2022 by bishop Andy Lines to act as the assistant bishop with responsibility for Wales, and consecrated in Aberystwyth on 18 March 2023.

Personal life

Bell is married to Prudence, and together they have three children.

References

Bibliography
 
 
 
 
 
 
 

Living people
Anglicans
Anglican bishops
Anglican bishops in Wales by diocese